Santa Maria ad Nives is a Roman Catholic church, located on Piazza Santa Maria Foris Portam, in Faenza, Italy.

Founded outside of the city walls, likely in the 6th-century, the church was once called Santa Maria Foris Portam, or Santa Maria Vecchia. Originally oriented towards an eastern apse, as was common with paleochristian churches, some state it was the first cathedral in the town. Some of the construction still dates to the 15th century, with blind arches next to the large windows. The sculpted columns at the entrance likely spolia from the 6th century. It was affiliated with a benedictine monastery, and was visited by St. Peter Damian while en route to die in the hermitage of Gamogna for the winter of 1072.

The interior was rebuilt and expanded in 1655, reversing the orientation, and adding a portico the entrance. Among the works inside are Gaspare Sacchi's altarpiece of the Virgin and Saints (1522) at the first altar on the left. In the chapel of St. Bernard of Clairvaux to the right of the main altar are small canvases depicting the Life of St. Bernard (circa 1610) by Niccolò Paganelli.

References

Renaissance architecture in Emilia-Romagna
Maria ad Nives
6th-century churches
Buildings and structures in the Province of Ravenna